His Late Excellency (German:Die selige Exzellenz) may refer to:

 His Late Excellency (1927 film), a German silent film
 His Late Excellency (1935 film), a German film